The 2013 Maldives FA Cup was the 26th edition of the Maldives FA Cup.

The cup winner were guaranteed a place in the 2014 AFC Cup.

Quarterfinals

|-
|colspan="3" style="background-color:#99CCCC"|2 August 2013

|-
|colspan="3" style="background-color:#99CCCC"|4 August 2013

|-
|colspan="3" style="background-color:#99CCCC"|5 August 2013

|-
|colspan="3" style="background-color:#99CCCC"|6 August 2013

|}

Semifinals

|-
|colspan="3" style="background-color:#99CCCC"|29 September 2013

|-
|colspan="3" style="background-color:#99CCCC"|30 September 2013

|}

Third place match

|-
|colspan="3" style="background-color:#99CCCC"|3 October 2013

|}

Final

|-
|colspan="3" style="background-color:#99CCCC"|4 October 2013

|}

References

External links
Football Association of Maldives

Maldives FA Cup seasons
FA Cup